CSSTidy is an open source Cascading Style Sheets parser and optimiser written by Florian Schmitz. C++ and PHP versions are available. The name derives from HTML Tidy, since CSSTidy is supposed to be its counterpart for CSS. Currently CSSTidy is able to fix some common errors (like missing units or semicolons) and reformat and compress CSS code.

The current version of CSSTidy is 1.3. This version was noted in the changelog on July 19, 2007, as the last version. The project was abandoned and the author was seeking a new maintainer for the project.

However, the PHP version has been forked by developers.

For downloading the C++ version Florian Schmitz now links to a still maintained project on GitHub.

References

External links
 
Online version at CSSTidyOnline.com
 Source code at GitHub.com
 HTML Purifier Library for cleaning HTML (with a focus on security).  Uses CSSTidy for CSS clean-up.

Cascading Style Sheets